Yousuf Mahmood Rahimbaksh (born 28 March 1990) is an Omani cricketer, who played for the Oman national cricket team. He played in the Asian Cricket Council Under-19 Elite Cup tournament in 2007. He was included in to the Oman Twenty20 International side for 2016 ICC World Twenty20, which is held in India.

References

External links
 

1990 births
Living people
Omani cricketers
Place of birth missing (living people)